Heather Kelley (aka Moboid) is a media artist, writer and video game designer. She is a co-founder of the Kokoromi experimental game collective, with whom she produces and curates the annual Gamma game event promoting experimental games as creative expression in a social context. She regularly appears as a jury member for several computer gaming festivals (such as Indiecade). She is also a frequent public speaker at technology events.

Her career in the games industry has included AAA next-gen console games, interactive smart toys, handheld games and web communities for girls. She has created interactive projections using game engines such as Quake and Unreal.

Heather Kelley was Creative Director on the UNFPA Electronic Game to End Gender Violence, at the Emergent Media Center at Champlain College in Burlington, Vermont. For seven years, Heather served as co-chair of the IGDA's Women in Game Development Special Interest Group.

In May 2014 she joined the Entertainment Technology Center at Carnegie Mellon University as an Assistant Teaching Professor.

In 2018, Kelley became the Sensory Director of LIKELIKE Arcade.

In July 2019, Kelley was hosted as the keynote speaker for the Nordic Game Jam after being the keynote speaker in 2009 as well.

Project examples
 Lapis (2005)  Lapis is an interactive art work designed to help teach women how to reach orgasm by simulating the effect of pleasurable sensation on a cartoon bunny.
 Fabulous/Fabuleux (2008) – An experimental art game collaboration with Lynn Hughes. Fabulous/Fabuleux was created at Concordia University's Hexagram Institute and integrates gameplay into a full-body interactive installation using custom "squishy" interface hardware.
 Body Heat (2010) – Body Heat is a vibrator interface for the iPhone and iPad which allows touchscreens to be used for adjusting vibration speed, intensity, and patterns. The project was first presented at the sex tech conference Arse Elektronika in September 2010 in San Francisco. The company OhMiBod, which specializes in music-driven vibrators, bought the application and renamed it into "OhMiBod app" in early 2011.
 Joue Le Jeu (2012) – An exhibition at La Gaîté Lyrique in Paris, France. It showcased new forms of games and creative game design. The event was a hands-on exhibition of interactive play.
“Trente pas entre terre et ciel: Version Musicale” (2018) – An installation debuted in Toronto, Canada. The project is a long hopscotch, designed to be played by multiple pairs of players at once.
Fortuitous Orbits and the Hazards They Contain (2019) – A two-person Exhibition at Arizona State University, ArtSpace West.
Housed Within Marrow (2020) – Carnegie Mellon University. Virtual.

Awards
Kelley's game concept Lapis, based on female masturbation, won the 2006 MIGS Game Design Challenge.

In Spring 2008, she was Kraus Visiting Assistant Professor of Art, and Adjunct Faculty at the Entertainment Technology Center, at Carnegie Mellon University, where she organized The Art of Play symposium and art game arcade.

In September 2009, she was Artist in Residence for Subotron at Quartier21, Museumsquartier Vienna. Her biographical sex game concept with Erin Robinson, Our First Times, won the 2009 GDC Game Design Challenge,

She was part of Fast Company's 2011 list of 'most influential women in technology'.

In March 2013 she was awarded the "GDC 2013 Women in Gaming Award" as "Innovator", granted for breakthrough innovation in her work.

DataBird Business Journal named Kelley in its 2019 list of 250 Inspiring Female Entrepreneurs.

Video game credits
Kelley is credited on the following games:
 Let's Talk About Me (1995), Simon & Schuster Interactive.
 Thief: Deadly Shadows (2004), Eidos, Inc.
 Tom Clancy's Splinter Cell: Chaos Theory (2005), Ubisoft, Inc.
 Star Wars: Lethal Alliance (2006), Ubisoft, Inc.
 High School Musical: Makin' the Cut! (2007), Disney Interactive Studios.
 Today I Die (2009).
 Spider: The Secret of Bryce Manor (2009), Tiger Style LLC.
 4 Minutes and 33 Seconds of Uniqueness (2009), Kloonigames Ltd.
 Waking Mars (2012), Tiger Style LLC.
 Fez (2012), Microsoft Studios, Trapdoor, Inc.
THE DANCINGULARITY (2012), Kokoromi, PC.
Window Vistas (2014), Mac.
SuperHyperCube (2016), Sony PlayStation VR.
Guilty Smells (2019), PC.

Film credits
Kelley co-produced the nerd documentary Traceroute (2016).

Publications 
Kelley has contributed to the following publications:

 "'EyeToy Play,' 'Animal Crossing,' 'Wii Sports'" in Space Time Play: Synergies Between Computer Games, Architecture and Urbanism. Sub-editor. Borries, Böttger, and Walz, ed., Birkhäuser, Basel, October 2007.
 On Turtles and Dragons and the Dangerous Quest for a Media Art Notation System. Contributing writer, contributing editor. Time's Up, Linz, 2012.
 “Proverted Pleasures: Orgasm and Gameplay” in Screw The System: Explorations of Spaces, Games and Politics through Sexuality and Technology. Grenzfurthner, Friesinger, and Fabry, ed., RE/Search Publications, 2014.
 Social Web and Interaction: Social Media Technologies for European National and Regional Museums. Contributing writer. European Museums Exhibiting Europe. 2014.
 Women in Gaming: 100 Professionals of Play.  Contributor. Marie, ed. Roseville, CA, Prima Games, 2018.

References

Living people
New media artists
American contemporary artists
Feminist artists
Year of birth missing (living people)
Video game designers
Women video game designers